Aspergillus lucknowensis is a species of fungus in the genus Aspergillus. It is from the Usti section. The species was first described in 1968.

References 

lucknowensis
Fungi described in 1968